Gang Cops is a 1988 American short documentary film directed by Thomas B. Fleming following the Los Angeles County Sheriff's Department's special gang unit in South Central Los Angeles. It was produced in collaboration with the USC Center for Visual Anthropology and the School of Cinema/Television.

Accolades
The film was nominated for an Academy Award for Best Documentary Short

References

External links

1988 films
1988 independent films
1980s short documentary films
American short documentary films
American independent films
American black-and-white films
Documentary films about law enforcement in the United States
Los Angeles County Sheriff's Department
Documentary films about Los Angeles
Documentary films about gangs in the United States
Gangs in Los Angeles
South Los Angeles
1980s English-language films
1980s American films